The dusky tit (Melaniparus funereus) is a species of bird in the tit family Paridae.
It is native to the African tropical rainforest.

The dusky tit was formerly one of the many species placed in the genus Parus. It was moved to the resurrected genus Melaniparus based on a molecular phylogenetic analysis published in 2013.

References

dusky tit
Birds of the African tropical rainforest
dusky tit
Taxonomy articles created by Polbot